Ones is a compilation album by American singer Selena, released in the United States on October 1, 2002 by EMI Latin. It was released on November 11, 2002 in Spanish-speaking countries, while the limited edition included a bonus DVD of her music videos. Ones was released building on the popularity of the 1997 biographical film Selena. The album was aimed at Selena's new generation of fans, and its release marked the singer's twentieth year in the music industry. Ones features six number one singles namely, "Amor Prohibido", "Bidi Bidi Bom Bom", "No Me Queda Más", "Fotos y Recuerdos", and her duets with Álvaro Torres on "Buenos Amigos" and the Barrio Boyzz on "Donde Quiera Que Estés".

Selena's brother, A.B. Quintanilla, remixed three of her singles ("Amor Prohibido", "Como la Flor" and "Si Una Vez") into a medley mash-up entitled "Con Tanto Amor Medley", the same tracks found on the album. Ones received a positive reception among music critics, while Jon O'Brien of AllMusic noticed that the record label ignored Selena's self-titled debut album. The recording peaked at number two on the US Billboard Top Latin Albums and number one on the Latin Pop Albums charts. Ones peaked at number 42 on the Billboard 200 chart and was certified 18× platinum by the Recording Industry Association of America (RIAA), signifying 1,080,000 album-equivalent units sold in the United States.

Background and release 
On March 31, 1995, American Tejano music singer Selena was shot and killed by Yolanda Saldívar, her friend and former manager of her boutiques. The impact of the singer's death had a negative impact on Latin music, her genre—which she catapulted it into the mainstream market—suffered and its popularity waned following Selena's death. Following her death, the singer's commodity grew, as interest in Selena sparked a buying frenzy among Hispanic and Latino Americans. The singer's father and manager, Abraham Quintanilla Jr. was forced to release Selena (1997), a biopic on Selena's life and career, after two major film production companies were in the process of making their own films about Selena without the consent of the singer's family. The film's release introduced a new generation of fans and inspired her family to release a compilation album containing the singer's most popular songs. In an interview with Julie Chen, her family explained their intentions on releasing Ones as way to showcase who Selena was as a singer and a performer. They included a bonus DVD of Selena's music videos for those who never saw her in person.

The album was released as part of the singer's 20th anniversary in the music industry. EMI Latin re-released Selena's previous works, which were remastered and included bonus tracks, music videos, and spoken liner notes containing commentary and recollections from the singer's family, friends, and her band. Ones was released on October 1, 2002 by EMI Latin, while Unos was released in Spanish-speaking countries.

Songs 

The singer's self-titled debut album was excluded from the tracklisting. The first of Selena's number ones to be featured on the album was her duet with Álvaro Torres on "Buenos Amigos". The song became the singer's first number one single in her career when it peaked at number one on the US Billboard Hot Latin Songs chart in June 1991. Two other songs were included from her second studio album Ven Conmigo (1990), of them were "No Quiero Saber" and "Baila Esta Cumbia". "Como la Flor", which became a career-launching single and the singer's signature song, was included on Ones, and together with "La Carcacha" were taken from Entre a Mi Mundo (1992). The singles from Selena's 1993 release Live!, made an appearance on the album as well. "No Debes Jugar", the lead single from Live!, was praised by critics for its distinguishable cumbia music sounds that ultimately became her trademark. The second single from Live!, "La Llamada", provided Selena her fourth top ten single.

Tracks from Selena's fourth studio album Amor Prohibido (1994), made up most of the tracklisting on Ones. The title track "Amor Prohibido" sampled the cencerro, which was intended by the singer's brother and record producer A.B. Quintanilla, to attract people of different ethnicities to Selena's music. "Bidi Bidi Bom Bom" became a popular song among the singer's younger fans, while posthumous reviews cited the song's catchiness and noted a sense of conviviality in the song. "No Me Queda Más", the third recording off of Amor Prohibido, was praised for the singer's vocal interpretations and her ability to tackle such a song reserved for established musicians twice her age. Another song from Amor Prohibido, "Fotos y Recuerdos", which sampled the Pretenders' 1983 single "Back on the Chain Gang", peaked at number one following Selena's death in April 1995. Other songs from Amor Prohibido including "El Chico del Apartamento 512", "Techno Cumbia", and "Si Una Vez", were included on Ones. Selena's duet with the Barrio Boyzz on their 1994 single "Donde Quiera Que Estés" is also featured on Ones, the track topped the Hot Latin Songs chart for six consecutive weeks. The singles "Tú Sólo Tú", "Siempre Hace Frio", "I Could Fall in Love", and "Dreaming of You", were released posthumously and were added to Ones. The latter two were shelved tracks intended for the Don Juan DeMarco (1995) soundtrack in which Selena made a cameo appearance. "I Could Fall in Love" and "Dreaming of You" were the only songs featured on Ones from the singer's intended crossover album Dreaming of You (1995).

Reception and chart performance 

The album was met with positive reviews from music critics. Ramiro Burr of the San Antonio Express-News compared Ones to the greatest hits releases of Buddy Holly, Janis Joplin and Jimi Hendrix. Jon O'Brien of AllMusic noticed that the company intentionally wanted to focus on Selena's career between 1990 and 1995, ignoring her 1989 debut album. The iTunes editorial team found Ones as a showcase of the singer's versatile soprano voice that inspires one to dance or be brought with emotion. They noted a sense of intonation, "spine-chilling" vibrato, and coherency throughout the album. Jessica Roiz of Billboard found Ones to have contained several of the singer's most popular singles. Roiz listed several songs included in Ones on her list of songs recorded by Selena that are meant to help those who are going through a breakup. Ones was marketed through TV advertisements as a replacement to Selena's previous works, which were removed from distribution. The album's release coincided with VH1's Behind the Music episode of Selena, which first aired on October 2, 2002.

Ones debuted at number four on the US Billboard Top Latin Albums and Latin Pop Albums chart on the week ending October 19, 2002, the highest-debuting album that week. The album debuted at number 162 on the Billboard 200 chart, before peaking at number 159 on the week ending November 9, 2002. In a year-end report compiled by Nielsen SoundScan, Ones was named with other Latin music albums, to have end the slight decline in Latin music sales that plagued the United States in the first and second quarters of 2002. The recording was nominated for the Latin Greatest Hits Album of the Year at the 2003 Billboard Latin Music Awards. Ones ended 2003 as the 13th best-selling Latin album and ninth best-selling Latin pop album of the year. Ones reentered the Top Latin Albums chart the week of February 7, 2004 at number 74 before slipping off and reentering the chart the week of March 13 at number 65. On the chart's April 17, 2004 list, Ones rose to number 11, receiving the highest percentage gains for an album that week, which was followed by the singer's ninth anniversary of her death. The album remained on the chart until May 29, 2004. Ones was removed from Billboards Top Latin Albums and Latin Pop Albums chart and began charting on the Top Latin Catalog Albums chart. On the April 19, 2009 chart, Ones rose 51-percent in sales and climbed 61-percent to number three on the Top Latin Catalog Albums chart, which was followed by the singer's 14th anniversary of her death. Ones ended up as the 88th best-selling Latin album of the 2000s decade.

On October 14, 2016, Ones was released on a limited edition purple double disc vinyl. The limited edition helped Ones debut and peak at number 70 on the Top Album Sales and number four on the Vinyl Albums chart. Ones also debuted on the Top Pop Catalog Albums chart, peaking at number seven. Following another revision to its Latin albums charts, Billboard removed its two-decade-long ban of catalog albums in its chart beginning with the February 11, 2017 list; Ones re-entered the Top Latin Albums and Latin Pop Albums chart after 15 years. After its revision, Ones claimed the number one position on the Latin Pop Albums chart within three weeks, dethroning CNCO's Primera Cita (2016). The album remained atop the Latin Pop Albums chart for six consecutive weeks and was displaced by Alejandro Fernandez' album Rompiendo Fronteras (2017) on April 8, 2017. Before its revision, Nielsen SoundScan reported that Ones sold 25,000 units in 2016; the seventh best-selling Latin album of the year, Ones was the best-selling Latin album by a woman in 2016. In 2017's mid-year report, Ones sold 42,000 album-equivalent units, while 13,000 were pure album sales, ranking as the seventh best-selling Latin album. In 2018's mid-year report, Ones sold 8,000 units and ranked as the tenth best-selling Latin album. On July 12, 2018, Ones reached number one on iTunes' Latin Albums chart, out-selling living musicians recent releases including Maluma's F.A.M.E. (2018), J Balvin's Vibras (2018), Ozuna's Odisea (2017), and Shakira's El Dorado (2017). The event was celebrated on the singer's official Facebook page while Billboard noticed that the album had reached its 140th week on their Top Latin Albums chart. Ones was certified platinum by the Recording Industry Association of America (RIAA) in February 2003, signifying that 100,000 units had been shipped in the United States. In November 2017 the RIAA recertified the album 18× platinum in the Latin field, denoting 1,080,000 album-equivalent units sold in the United States.

Track listing

Personnel 
Credits are taken from the album's liner notes.

Vocals
Selena—main vocalist
Álvaro Torres—guest artist
Trey Lorenz—backing vocalist
Lucy Perez—backing vocalist

Composers
A.B. Quintanilla
Pete Astudillo 
Miguel Flores
Cliff Friend
Franne Golde
Chrissie Hynde
Felipe Valdés Leal
K. C. Porter
Cuco Sánchez
Tom Snow
Keith Thomas
Alvaro Torres
Ricky Vela

Engineers
Marcelo Añez
Gregg Vickers
José Luis Arroyave
Juan Jose Virviescas

Instrumentals
José Luis Arroyave—keyboards
Kike Santander—keyboards
Joe Ojeda—keyboards
Manny López—guitar (nylon string)
Chris Pérez—guitar
Henry Gomez—guitar
Tedoy Mullet—trumpet
Arturo Meza—percussion
Jesse "O'Jay" Martinez—percussion
Suzette Quintanilla—drums
Eliza Howardson—violin

Producers
A.B. Quintanilla III
José Luis Arroyave—programming 
Sergio Minski
Guillermo J. Page
Jorge Alberto Pino—executive producer
Andrés Felipe Silva—executive director
Kike Santander

Charts

Weekly charts

Quarterly charts

Year-end charts

Decade-end charts

Certifications

See also 

 2002 in Latin music
 Selena albums discography
 List of number-one Billboard Latin Pop Albums from the 2010s
 Latin American music in the United States

References

Works cited

External links 

2002 greatest hits albums
Selena compilation albums
Albums produced by A.B. Quintanilla
EMI Latin compilation albums
Spanish-language compilation albums
Compilation albums published posthumously
Albums recorded at Q-Productions